

Steve Seligman is a former American stock car racing driver. A native of Lake Forest, Illinois, Seligman raced in the ARCA, ARTGO and ASA series during the 1980s. Starting in 1989, Seligman moved to the NASCAR Winston Cup Series; he attempted to qualify for 13 races between 1989 and 1996, but never successfully qualified for a race in NASCAR's top series. Seligman did compete in the 1996 Winston Open, the qualifying event for NASCAR's all-star race; he started 34th of 36 cars that qualified, and finished 27th.

In February 1997, a police raid found cocaine in significant quantities at Seligman's race shop. He was arrested and suspended by NASCAR; he was found guilty and sentenced to 27 years in prison.

Motorsports career results

NASCAR
(key) (Bold - Pole position awarded by qualifying time. Italics - Pole position earned by points standings or practice time. * – Most laps led.)

Winston Cup Series

Daytona 500

ARCA Permatex SuperCar Series
(key) (Bold – Pole position awarded by qualifying time. Italics – Pole position earned by points standings or practice time. * – Most laps led.)

References

External links
 
 Steve Seligman at Ultimate Racing History

Living people
Sportspeople from Lake Forest, Illinois
Racing drivers from Illinois
NASCAR drivers
ARCA Menards Series drivers
American Speed Association drivers
American people convicted of drug offenses
1954 births
Sportspeople convicted of crimes
ARCA Midwest Tour drivers